Thyranthrene is a genus of moths in the family Sesiidae.

Species
Thyranthrene adumbrata Bartsch, 2008
Thyranthrene albicincta (Hampson, 1919)
Thyranthrene metazonata Hampson, 1919
Thyranthrene obliquizona (Hampson, 1910)
Thyranthrene pyrophora (Hampson, 1919)

References

Sesiidae